Minnesota was a Eurodance group formed in Germany. It was created by Thomas Allison and Ralf Kappmeier, two German producers. They released two singles, their first was "What's Up", a cover of the 4 Non Blondes song. It peaked at number 22 on the Swiss Singles Chart and reached number one on the RPM Dance Chart in Canada. Their second single, "Without You" peaked at number 39 on the Swiss Singles Chart.

Discography

Singles

References

German Eurodance groups
German dance music groups
German house music groups
Musical groups established in 1993
1993 establishments in Germany